Joaquim Justino Carreira (29 January 1950 − 1 September 2013) was a Portuguese-born Brazilian Roman Catholic bishop.

Born in Leiria, Portugal and ordained to the priesthood in 1977, Carreira was named bishop in 2005. In 2011, he was named bishop of the Roman Catholic Diocese of Guarulhos, Brazil. He died while still in office on 1 September 2013, aged 63, in São Paulo.

References

1950 births
People from Leiria
2013 deaths
21st-century Roman Catholic bishops in Brazil
Roman Catholic bishops of São Paulo
Roman Catholic bishops of Guarulhos